Morris Michael Edelstein (February 5, 1888 – June 4, 1941) was a Polish-born Congressional Representative and lawyer from the state of New York, serving from 1940 to 1941.

Biography 
Edelstein was born in Meseritz (Międzyrzec Podlaski), Poland. At three years of age immigrated to the United States with his parents, who settled in New York City. He attended public schools and Cooper Union College in New York. He graduated from the Brooklyn Law School of St. Lawrence University, in 1909, and was admitted to the bar in 1910 and practiced law in New York.

Edelstein lived with his mother until the end of his life, having never married. His mother was 85 at the time of his death.

Congress 
Edelstein was elected as a Democrat to the Seventy-sixth Congress to fill the vacancy caused by the death of William I. Sirovich. He was reelected to the Seventy-seventh Congress and served from February 6, 1940, until his death on June 4, 1941, in the cloakroom of the House of Representatives, Washington, D.C., after completing the delivery of a speech on the floor of the House.

Death on June 4, 1941
Edelstein's last speech was a response to Mississippi Representative John Elliott Rankin, widely described as an anti-Semite who advocated peace with Nazi Germany. Rankin had just delivered a House floor speech accusing "international Jewish brethren" of trying to drag America into World War II.

In response, Edelstein, who was Jewish said: "Hitler started out by speaking about 'Jewish brethren.' It is becoming the play and the work of those people who want to demagogue to speak about their 'Jewish brethren' and 'international bankers.' ... I deplore the idea that ... men in this House ... attempt to use the Jews as their scapegoat. I say it is unfair and I say it is un-American. ... All men are created equal, regardless of race, creed or color, and whether a man be Jew or Gentile, he may think what he deems fit." Edelstein then walked out of the House. He collapsed and died shortly afterwards in the House cloakroom.

He is buried in Mount Zion Cemetery, Maspeth, New York. 15,000 mourners attended his funeral.

Legacy

The SS M. Michael Edelstein, a World War II liberty ship, was named in his honor.

See also
List of Jewish members of the United States Congress
List of United States Congress members who died in office (1900–49)

References

External links

1888 births
1941 deaths
19th-century American Jews
20th-century American Jews
20th-century American politicians
Brooklyn Law School alumni
Cooper Union alumni
Jewish members of the United States House of Representatives
American people of Polish-Jewish descent
Congress Poland emigrants to the United States
Burials at Mount Zion Cemetery (New York City)
Death in Washington, D.C.
Democratic Party members of the United States House of Representatives from New York (state)
People from Międzyrzec Podlaski